Portugal competed at the Deaflympics for the first in 1993. Since then Portugal  has been regularly participating at the Deaflympics. Portugal won its first Deaflympics medal also in 1993. Portugal has never participated in the Winter Deaflympics.

Medal tallies

Summer Deaflympics

See also 
Portugal at the Paralympics
Portugal at the Olympics

References 

Nations at the Deaflympics
Parasports in Portugal
Deaf culture in Portugal
D